Adi Ben-Israel (Hebrew: עדי בן-ישראל, born November 6, 1933) is a  mathematician and an engineer, working in applied mathematics, optimization, statistics, operations research and other areas. He is a Professor of Operations Research at Rutgers University, New Jersey.

Research topics 

Ben-Israel's research has included generalized inverses of matrices, in particular the Moore–Penrose pseudoinverse, and of operators, their extremal properties, computation and applications. as well as local inverses of nonlinear mappings. In the area of linear algebra, he studied the matrix volume  and its applications, basic, approximate and least-norm solutions, and the geometry of subspaces.  He wrote about ordered incidence geometry and the geometric foundations of convexity.

In the topic of iterative methods, he published papers about the Newton method for systems of equations with rectangular or [[Search Results
Jacobian matrix and determinant|singular Jacobians]], directional Newton methods, the quasi-Halley method, Newton and Halley methods for complex roots, and the inverse Newton transform.

Ben-Israel's research into optimization included linear programming, a Newtonian bracketing method of convex minimization, input optimization, and risk modeling of dynamic programming, and the calculus of variations.  He also studied various aspects of clustering and location theory, and investigated decisions under uncertainty.

Publications 

Books
 Generalized Inverses: Theory and Applications, with T.N.E. Greville, J. Wiley, New York, 1974
 Optimality in Nonlinear Programming: A Feasible Directions Approach, with A. Ben-Tal and S. Zlobec, J. Wiley, New York, 1981 
 Mathematik mit DERIVE (German), with W. Koepf and R.P. Gilbert, Vieweg-Verlag,  Berlin, 1993 
 Computer Supported Calculus: With MACSYMA, with R.P. Gilbert, Springer-Verlag, Vienna, 2001
 Generalized Inverses: Theory and Applications (2nd edition), with T.N.E. Greville, Springer-Verlag, New York, 2003
Selected articles
 Contributions to the theory of generalized inverses,  J. Soc. Indust. Appl. Math. 11(1963), 667–699, (with A. Charnes) 

 A Newton–Raphson method for the solution of systems of equations, J. Math. Anal. Appl. 15(1966), 243–252
 Linear equations and inequalities on finite-dimensional, real or complex, vector spaces: A unified theory, J. Math. Anal. Appl. 27(1969), 367–389

 Ordered incidence geometry and the geometric foundations of convexity theory,  J. Geometry 30(1987), 103–122, (with A. Ben-Tal)
 Input optimization for infinite horizon discounted programs, J. Optimiz. Th. Appl. 61(1989), 347–357, (with S.D. Flaam)
 Certainty equivalents and information measures: Duality and extremal principles, J. Math. Anal. Appl. 157(1991), 211–236 (with A. Ben-Tal and M. Teboulle).
 A volume associated with mxn matrices, Lin. Algeb. and Appl. 167(1992), 87–111.
 The Moore of the Moore–Penrose inverse, Electron. J. Lin. Algeb. 9(2002), 150–157.
  The Newton bracketing method for convex minimization, Comput. Optimiz. and Appl. 21(2002), 213–229 (with Y. Levin).
 An inverse Newton transform, Contemporary Math. 568(2012), 27–40.
 A concentrated Cauchy distribution with finite moments, Annals of Oper. Res. (to appear)

References

External links 
 Adi Ben-Israel personal webpage
 Adi Ben-Israel at the Mathematics Genealogy Project

Rutgers University faculty
Living people
1933 births
American mathematicians
Place of birth missing (living people)